Javier Glatt (born October 10, 1981, in Calgary, Alberta) is a retired professional Canadian football linebacker who played for eight seasons in the Canadian Football League. He was most recently a member of the Edmonton Eskimos, but spent seven years with the BC Lions and won a Grey Cup championship with the team in 2006. He is the younger brother of former CFL player J. P. Izquierdo.

College career
At UBC, he was the Canadian West Conference Defensive Player of the Year in 2002, and a 3 time CIS All-Canadian as a UBC Thunderbird. After spending most of his first 3 seasons as primarily a backup linebacker and special teams player for the Lions, in 2006 he became the team's starting middle linebacker and played a crucial role in winning the 2006 Grey Cup. Glatt also played baseball for University of British Columbia in their early 2000-2001 stages, and was a teammate of Mark Zamjoc, Derran Watts, Jeff Francis and UBC baseball assistant coach (currently, was a former player) Cav Whitely.

Professional career
Glatt was drafted 15th overall, in the second round, in the 2003 CFL Draft by the BC Lions. He spent three years as a backup before earning a position as the team's starting middle linebacker in 2006, while also helping the Lions win the 94th Grey Cup that year. In 2008 Glatt made his first CFL All-Star Team after finishing 4th in the CFL with 88 Defensive tackles along with 6 tackles for loss, 2 sacks, 2 interceptions, 2 forced fumbles, and 2 fumble recoveries. Glatt has played in a total of 143 CFL games recording 444 tackles, 14 sacks, and 11 Interceptions (including 1 he returned 56 yards for a TD) over his 8-year career (7 with the BC Lions and 1 with the Edmonton Eskimos). On August 4, 2009, Javier Glatt was moved to back up and special teams when the Lions signed free agent JoJuan Armour, the former starting linebacker for the Calgary Stampeders.  On January 29, 2010, Glatt was released by the BC Lions. On February 10, 2010 Glatt signed with the Edmonton Eskimos. After one season as a backup with the Eskimos, Glatt retired from professional football on March 8, 2011.

Glatt went on to co-found CadMakers in 2014, a company that specializes in integrating advanced parametric design and construction technologies (such as automation, and prefabrication) with a focus on bringing manufacturing techniques into the construction industry.

References

1981 births
Living people
BC Lions players
Canadian football linebackers
Edmonton Elks players
Canadian football people from Calgary
Players of Canadian football from Alberta
UBC Thunderbirds baseball players
UBC Thunderbirds football players
University of British Columbia alumni